Halab is the ancient name of Aleppo in northern Syria.

Halab may also refer to:

Places
 Aleppo Governorate, Syria
 Halab, Iran, a city in Zanjan Province, Iran
 Halab, Isfahan, a village in Isfahan Province, Iran
 Halab District, an administrative subdivision of Iran

Other uses
 Halab, a subgroup of the Dom people of North Africa

See also
 Halab 100, an Egyptian ship of the line, see List of ships of the line of Egypt
 Radhuiya Halab Fakhir, an elected member in the Iraqi Babil governorate council election, 2005
 Halabja, a town in Iraqi Kurdistan and the site of 1988 poison gas attack
 Aleppo (disambiguation)